For the first and second Irish Film and Television Awards ceremonies, supporting performances for film and television were combined into one category. Up until the 2018–2019 film season, awards were given for films released in Ireland the previous year.

Winners and nominees

2000s

2010s

2020s

Statistics

Multiple wins
3 wins:
 Saoirse Ronan

2 wins:
 Fionnula Flanagan

Multiple nominations

4 nominations:
 Saoirse Ronan
 Ger Ryan

3 nominations:
 Sinéad Cusack
 Fionnula Flanagan

2 nominations:
 Niamh Algar
 Caitríona Balfe
 Kerry Condon
 Anne-Marie Duff
 Amy Huberman
 Ruth Negga
 Nora-Jane Noone
 Deirdre O'Kane
 Catherine Walker
 Eileen Walsh

See also 
 Irish Film & Television Award for Best Supporting Actor
 Irish Film & Television Award for Best Actress in a Lead Role – Film

References

Supporting Actress - Film